Platycnemis agrioides is a species of damselfly in the family Platycnemididae. It is endemic to Mayotte. Its natural habitats are subtropical or tropical moist lowland forests and rivers. It is threatened by habitat loss.

Sources

Platycnemididae
Insects described in 1915
Taxonomy articles created by Polbot
Taxobox binomials not recognized by IUCN